San Bonaventura da Bagnoregio is a titular church located in Rome, Italy.

Location
San Bonaventura da Bagnoregio is located to the east of Centocelle Airport. The nearest Metro station is Parco di Centocelle.

It is not to be confused with the church of San Bonaventura al Palatino, located on the Palatine Hill.

History
On 1 November 1974 the parish was established by Cardinal Ugo Poletti and entrusted to the Minorites. The church was designed by Francesco Paolo Riccobene and consecrated on 19 May 1999 by Cardinal Camillo Ruini.

In 2018, Pope Francis declared it a titular church and assigned it to Joseph Coutts, Archbishop of Karachi.

Cardinal-Priests

Joseph Coutts (29 September 2018–present)

References

Bonaventura da Bagnoregio
20th-century churches